Haukur Sigurðsson (28 July 1930 – 16 November 2006) was an Icelandic alpine skier. He competed in three events at the 1952 Winter Olympics.

References

1930 births
2006 deaths
Haukur Sigurdsson
Haukur Sigurdsson
Alpine skiers at the 1952 Winter Olympics
20th-century Icelandic people